The Indian pike conger (Congresox talabonoides, also known as the common eel, the conger-pike eel, the daggertooth pike-conger, and the Indian putyekanipa) is an eel in the family Muraenesocidae (pike congers). It was described by Pieter Bleeker in 1853. It is a marine, tropical eel which is known from the Indo-Western Pacific, including Somalia, India, Sri Lanka, Indonesia, the Philippines, Hong Kong and Taiwan.

The Indian pike conger is amphidromous; spawning is reported in India to occur in April–May and September–October. Its diet consists of bony fish, shrimp, and other benthic crustaceans. It is a commercial fish in markets, and is mostly sold fresh.

References

Muraenesocidae
Fish described in 1853